Lasiognathus waltoni is a species of wolftrap angler known from the eastern central Pacific Ocean. The females of this species grow to a length of  SL. This species is characterized by a membranous anterior crest on its escal bulb, and an elongated, cylindrical distal escal appendage without a prolongation at the tip. Its species name honors Sir Isaac Walton, author of The Compleat Angler.

References
 

Thaumatichthyidae
Fish described in 1875